Magane Magane is a 1982 Indian Tamil-language film directed by K. N. Lakshmanan and written by Panchu Arunachalam, starring Suresh, Manju Bhargavi and Poornima Rao. The film was released on 25 December 1982.

Plot

Cast 

 Suresh
 Manju Bhargavi
 Poornima Rao

Soundtrack 
The music was composed by Ilaiyaraaja. The lyrics for the songs were written by Panchu Arunachalam and Vairamuthu.

References

External links 
 

1980s Tamil-language films
1982 films
Films scored by Ilaiyaraaja
Films with screenplays by Panchu Arunachalam